Smooth Lake District is an Independent Local Radio station for the Lakes, owned and operated by Global and part of the Smooth network.

Overview

Originally known as Lakeland Radio, the station broadcasts from transmitters at Kendal on 100.1 MHz, the western side of Lake Windermere on 100.8 MHz and Keswick Forest on 101.4 MHz.

Originally licensed to serve the South Lakes, the station's coverage area extended northwards on 23 April 2013 when it began broadcasting to Keswick and surrounding villages. Part of the service area overlaps with that of its Lancaster-based sister station The Bay (now Heart North Lancashire & Cumbria).

On 20 November 2017, CN Group announced Lakeland Radio would be sold to Global along with sister station The Bay - the sale was finalised by 1 December 2017. Global later announced Lakeland Radio would become part of the Smooth network.

The Lakeland Radio brand and programming was phased out during February 2018 and following a transition period, the station was relaunched as Smooth Lake District at 6am on Monday 5 March 2018.

In September 2019, the station closed its Kendal studios and co-located with sister station Smooth North West in Manchester.

Following OFCOM's decision to relax local content obligations from commercial radio, Smooth's local Drivetime and weekend shows were replaced by network programming from London. Local news bulletins, traffic updates and advertising were retained, alongside the station's Lake District breakfast show.

Programming
Local programming is produced and broadcast from Global's Manchester studios from 6-10am on weekdays. All networked programming originates from Global's London headquarters, including The Smooth Drive Home with Angie Greaves.

News
Global's Newsroom broadcasts hourly local news bulletins from 6am-7pm on weekdays and from 6am-12pm at weekends.

National news updates air hourly from Global's London headquarters at all other times.

See also
Heart North Lancashire & Cumbria

References

External links
 Smooth Lake District
 Media UK
 History of local radio in Cumbria
 Kendal transmitter
 Windermere transmitter

Radio stations in Cumbria
Lake District